Strachey Stump is a flat-topped mountain rising to 1,630 m, located 5 nautical miles (9 km) northeast of Mount Wegener in Read Mountains, Shackleton Range, in Antarctica.

It was photographed from the air by the U.S. Navy in 1967 and was surveyed by the British Antarctic Survey (BAS) between 1968 and 1971. In association with names of geologists grouped in this area, it was named by the United Kingdom Antarctic Place-Names Committee (UK-APC) in 1971 after John Strachey (1671–1742), the English geologist who made one of the first attempts to construct a geological cross-section.

Mountains of Coats Land